E. J. Flanagan (1883 – July 10, 1957), from Wapato, Washington, was a member of the Washington State Senate.

Biography
Flanagan was born in Wisconsin in 1883. He would become a rancher.

Political career
Flanagan was a member of the Senate from 1943 to 1947. He was a Republican. Poor health forced Flanagan to resign from office in the winter of 1956, and he died the following year in Yakima, Washington.

References

People from Wisconsin
Republican Party Washington (state) state senators
Ranchers from Washington (state)
1883 births
People from Wapato, Washington
1957 deaths
20th-century American politicians